Laffoon is a surname. Notable people with the surname include:

Ky Laffoon (1908–1984), American golfer
Polk Laffoon (1844–1906), American politician
Reuben Laffoon (1854–1929), Washington state pioneer and lawyer
Ruby Laffoon (1869–1941), American politician

See also 
Lafon (disambiguation)
Laffon